Champion Christian College is a private Christian college in Hot Springs, Arkansas. The college is associated with the Gospel Light Baptist Church.

History
Champion Christian College (formerly known as Champion Baptist College) was founded in 2005.

Academics
The college offers Associate, Bachelor's, and master's degrees.

Student life

Athletics
The college's athletic program is known as the Champion Christian Tigers and fields a men's basketball team as an independent member of the Association of Christian College Athletics (ACCA).  On December 30, 2013, the Tigers lost 116–12 to Southern University. To start this game, Southern went on a 44–0 run, which is an all-division NCAA record for the most points scored by one team to start a game.

References

External links
Official website

Private universities and colleges in Arkansas
Education in Garland County, Arkansas
Buildings and structures in Hot Springs, Arkansas
Educational institutions established in 2005
2005 establishments in Arkansas
Association of Christian College Athletics member schools